Cox v. United States, 332 U.S. 442 (1947), was a case in which the Supreme Court of the United States found that courts have only limited scope of review over a Selective Service Board's classification of a Jehovah's Witness as a conscientious objector rather than a minister.

Justice Reed delivered the opinion. Justice Murphy, in dissent said "the mere fact that they spent less than full time in ministerial activities affords no reasonable basis for implying a non-ministerial status."

A rehearing was denied on February 12, 1948.

See also
 Conscientious objection in the United States
 List of United States Supreme Court cases, volume 332
 Mora v. McNamara

References

External links
 

United States Supreme Court cases
United States Supreme Court cases of the Vinson Court
United States free exercise of religion case law
1947 in United States case law
Jehovah's Witnesses litigation in the United States
1947 in religion
Conscientious objection
United States military case law
Christianity and law in the 20th century